The Gov. Frank M. Byrne House in Faulkton, South Dakota was built in about 1898 and was remodeled in 1904 and 1917.  It was listed on the National Register of Historic Places in 1992.

It was a home of South Dakota governor Frank M. Byrne during c.1901 to 1923, including during the four years he was in office as governor.

The original building was a late example of Stick Style architecture;  the later renovations added Craftsman influences.

References

Houses on the National Register of Historic Places in South Dakota
Queen Anne architecture in South Dakota
Houses completed in 1913
National Register of Historic Places in Faulk County, South Dakota
Governor of South Dakota